Billiards and Snooker at the 2005 Southeast Asian Games were held at the Makati Coliseum in Makati, Metro Manila. Participants competed in several events. This was the first time that women were allowed to compete in the events.

Medal table

Medalists

Carom
Men

Pool
Men

Women

Snooker
Men

External links
Southeast Asian Games Official Results
Billiards in the Philippines and the SEA Games

2005 Southeast Asian Games events
Cue sports at the Southeast Asian Games
2005 in cue sports
Cue sports in the Philippines